Paul Curry (born 5 May 1961) is an English golfer.

Curry was born in Colchester. He turned professional in 1979 and played on the European Tour through most of the 1980s and 1990s. He finished in the top one hundred of the Order of Merit ten times, with a best of 33rd place in 1994, the year he won his only European Tour title, the Jersey European Airways Open.

Having lost his place on the European Tour, Curry moved to the United States and won a PGA Tour card at the 1999 qualifying school. During his rookie season in 2000, he made only seven cuts in twenty five outings to lose his playing status on the tour. He made several return trips to the qualifying tournament without success.

Curry played several events on the second tier Nationwide Tour in 2001, and latterly has competed on the third tier NGA Hooters Tour.

Professional wins (4)

European Tour wins (1)

PGA EuroPro Tour wins (2)

Other wins (1)
2009 The Bridgestone Winter Series at Forest Lake Golf Club (NGA Hooters Tour)

Results in major championships

Note: Curry only played in The Open Championship.

CUT = missed the half-way cut
"T" = tied

See also
1999 PGA Tour Qualifying School graduates

External links

Paul Curry – results and statistics on the NGA Hooters Tour's official site

English male golfers
European Tour golfers
PGA Tour golfers
European Senior Tour golfers
Sportspeople from Colchester
People from East Bergholt
Sportspeople from Seminole County, Florida
People from Longwood, Florida
1961 births
Living people